Emily Cox may refer to:

 Emily Cox (actress) (born 1985), British actress
 Emily Cox (puzzle writer), American puzzle writer  
 Emily Cox (conductor), Australian conductor and choir master